Start-Up PH is a 2022 Philippine television drama romance series broadcast by GMA Network. The series is an adaptation of the 2020 South Korean television drama series Start-Up. Directed by Jerry Lopez Sineneng and Dominic Zapata, it stars Alden Richards, Bea Alonzo, Yasmien Kurdi, and Jeric Gonzales. It premiered on September 26, 2022 on the network's Telebabad line up. The series concluded on December 23, 2022 with a total of 65 episodes.

The series is streaming online on YouTube.

Cast and characters
Lead cast
 Alden Richards as Tristan "Good Boy" Hernandez
 Bea Alonzo as Danica "Dani" C. Sison-Hernandez
 Yasmien Kurdi as Katrina "Ina" C. Sison / Katrina "Ina" C. Diaz
 Jeric Gonzales as Davidson "Dave" Navarro

Supporting cast
 Gina Alajar as Ligaya "Joy" Sison
 Kim Domingo as Stephanie Rios
 Royce Cabrera as Jefferson "Jeff" Katipunan
 Boy 2 Quizon as Wilson Espiritu
 Ayen Munji-Laurel as Alicia "Alice" Cortez-Sison / Alicia "Alice" Cortez-Diaz
 Jackie Lou Blanco as Cassandra "Sandra" Castillejos-Yoon
 Gabby Eigenmann as Arnold Diaz
 Niño Muhlach as Samuel "Sammy" Navarro
 Lovely Rivero as Rhodora "Dang" Navarro
 Kevin Santos as Darwin Pascual
 Tim Yap as Angelo "Mr. A" Angeles
 Kaloy Tingcungco as Spencer Diaz
 Jay Arcilla as Angelo Joseph "Anjo" Perez
 Brianna Bunagan as Joanna "Joan" Perez
Guest cast
 Neil Ryan Sese as Romualdo "Chito" Sison
 Marco Masa as young Tristan Hernandez
 Princess Aguilar as young Danica Sison
 Dayara Shane as young Katrina Sison 
 Seth dela Cruz as young Davidson Navarro
Benjie Paras as himself
Jojo Alejar as Master Mentor

Production
Principal photography commenced on April 4, 2022.

Episodes

References

External links
 
 

2022 Philippine television series debuts
2022 Philippine television series endings
Filipino-language television shows
GMA Network drama series
Philippine romance television series
Philippine television series based on South Korean television series
Television shows set in the Philippines
Workplace drama television series